This is a list of nations, as represented by National Paralympic Committees (NPCs), that have participated in the Winter Paralympic Games between 1976 and 2022. The Winter Paralympic Games have been held every four years (once during each Paralympiad) since 1976,and in 1994 when the Winter Games were moved to the middle of the Paralympiad, two years after the previous Games. 61 NPCs (56 of the current 174 NPCs and 5 obsolete NPCs) have participated in at least one Winter Games, and eight nations (Austria, Canada, Finland, France, Great Britain, Norway, Sweden and Switzerland) have participated in all eleven Winter Games to date. Including continuity from Czechoslovakia, the Czech Republic and Slovakia have also been represented in every edition.

Table legend

Alphabetical list

Nations that have never competed
118 of the 174 active NPCs have yet to compete in a Winter Paralympics.

References

Paralympics-related lists